Linda Leatherdale was a columnist for the Toronto Sun specializing in financial matters. In  May 2009, she was appointed Vice President of Business and Marketing Development in Canada by natural quartz company Cambria.

References

External links 
 Leatherdale's web page

Living people
Canadian columnists
Canadian women journalists
Canadian women columnists
Canadian women non-fiction writers
Year of birth missing (living people)